The Green Inferno or variation, may refer to: 

Natura contro (film), also known as The Green Inferno, a 1988 Italian film 
The Green Inferno (film), a 2013 American film
 "Zelený peklo" (song), also known as "Green Inferno", a 1997 song by 'Chaozz' off the album Zprdeleklika
 "Green Inferno" (song), a song by 'Agoraphobic Nosebleed' off the 2005 album Bestial Machinery (Discography Volume 1)

See also

 
 
 
 Green Fire (disambiguation)
 Green Hell (disambiguation)
 Inferno (disambiguation)
 Green (disambiguation)